Mount Boman is a mountain, 1,630 m, between Tranter and Doss glaciers in the north part of the Queen Elizabeth Range. Mapped by the United States Geological Survey (USGS) from tellurometer surveys and Navy air photos, 1960–62. Named by Advisory Committee on Antarctic Names (US-ACAN) for William M. Boman, United States Antarctic Research Program (USARP) traverse engineer at Roosevelt Island, 1962–63, and McMurdo Station, winter of 1965.

Mountains of the Ross Dependency
Shackleton Coast